The Supremes is the twenty-seventh studio album by The Supremes, released in 1975 on Motown Records.

Overview
Because of contract disputes, nearly two and a half years passed between The Supremes and the previous Supremes LP, The Supremes Produced and Arranged by Jimmy Webb. During that time, the group's lineup had undergone another major shift. Jean Terrell and Lynda Laurence both quit the group in August 1973, and remaining member and founding Supreme Mary Wilson was forced to form a new lineup. Cindy Birdsong was ready to return to the group after her maternity leave the previous year, and following a tip from former Supremes producer Lamont Dozier, Wilson hired Scherrie Payne, the younger sister of Freda Payne as the Supremes' new co-lead singer, who maintained the role until the group officially disbanded at a concert in London at the Theatre Royal, Drury Lane on June 12, 1977.

Despite the long delay, The Supremes''' first single, "He's My Man", became a #1 single on the Billboard Disco charts in 1975. The song "It's All Been Said Before" was originally chosen as the first single, and assigned a release number by Motown, but was withdrawn at the last minute, and replaced by "He's My Man".

For this release brothers Brian and Edward Holland, who wrote the Supremes' megahits of the 1960s, contributed the second single, "Where Do I Go from Here", and a song with Mary Wilson on lead, "Early Morning Love", that was released as a single in the United Kingdom only. Two legendary songwriters and producers from the South also worked with the trio: Alabama musician Terry Woodford, who started playing rock and roll in Muscle Shoals, and became a top producer and composer, and his colleague, Florida-born Clayton Ivey, one of the original musicians of the Muscle Shoals rhythm section, produced several songs but only four of them were released. "The Sha-La Bandit", in its original version has all three Supremes on leads (including a rare lead vocal by Cindy Birdsong), and although it was shelved, it was released in the end on the anthology The Supremes: At Their Best; while the instrumental track of "Bend a Little" was released in 1976 in the disco collection Motown Magic Disco Machine Volume II. Producer Hal Davis (of "Don't Leave Me This Way", "Love Hangover" and "Dancing Machine" fame) produced a couple of dance tracks, but only a song with a gospel touch, "This Is Why Believe in You" was released.

Songs recorded for the album, but not used, include "I Can Never Recover", produced by the Holland brothers; "Can We Love Again", another Mary Wilson solo; a cover of Betty Everett's "The Shoop Shoop Song (It's in His Kiss)", "Dance Fever", "Seed of Love", and "Hey, Mr. Boogieman". The entire album and those unreleased tracks finally appeared for the first time on CD on May 17, 2011 on the three-disc set Let Yourself Go: The '70s Albums, Vol 2 - 1974–1977: The Final Sessions''.

Track listing
Superscripts denote lead singers for each track: (a) Scherrie Payne, (b) Mary Wilson.

Side one
"He's My Man" (Greg Wright, Karin Patterson) a, b - 2:55
"Early Morning Love" (Harold Beatty, Brian Holland, Edward Holland, Jr.) b - 3:11
"Where Is It I Belong" (Samuel Brown, III, Ronald Brown, Elaine Brown) b - 3:53
"It's All Been Said Before" (Dennis Lambert, Brian Potter) a - 2:30
"This Is Why I Believe in You" (Michael B. Sutton, Pam Sawyer) a, b - 3:10

Side two
"You Can't Stop a Girl in Love" (Terry Woodford, George Soulé) a - 2:31
"Color My World Blue" (Frank Johnson) a - 2:32
"Give Out, But Don't Give Up" (Terry Woodford, Clayton Ivey, Barbara Wyrick) a - 2:33
"Where Do I Go from Here" (Edward Holland, Jr., Brian Holland) a - 3:29
"You Turn Me Around" (Barry Mann, Cynthia Weil) b - 2:30

Personnel
Scherrie Payne - lead and backing vocals
Mary Wilson - lead and backing vocals
Cindy Birdsong - backing vocals
Terry Woodford, Clayton Ivey, Brian Holland, Hal Davis, Greg Wright, Michael Lloyd, Mark Davis - producers
David Blumberg, James Anthony Carmichael, Mark Davis, Oliver Thomas, Arthur Wright, Clayton Ivey, Terry Woodford, Ted Stovall, Gene Page, Paul Riser - arrangers

Singles history
"He's My Man" b/w "Give Out, But Don't Give Up" (Motown 1358, June 1975)
"Where Do I Go From Here" b/w "Give Out, But Don't Give Up" (Motown 1374, October 1975)
"Early Morning Love" b/w "Where Is It I Belong?"(Tamla-Motown 1012, 1975, UK only)

Chart history

References

1975 albums
The Supremes albums
Albums arranged by Gene Page
Albums arranged by Paul Riser
Albums produced by Hal Davis
Albums produced by Brian Holland
Motown albums